James Carroll (born October 25, 1961) is an American politician who has served since 2019 as a member of the Vermont House of Representatives. He is a member of the Democratic Party. He replaced Representative Kiah Morris on the ballot when she decided not to run for reelection in 2018.

References

External links
Profile at Vote Smart

Living people
1961 births
People from Bennington, Vermont
Southern Vermont College alumni
Democratic Party members of the Vermont House of Representatives
21st-century American politicians